Jeff Cameron (born Goffredo Scarciofolo, 1932 - 1985) was an Italian actor. He appeared in more than thirty films from 1962 to 1973.

Filmography

References

External links 

Date of birth unknown
1985 deaths
Italian male film actors
1932 births